Mount Eldridge is a  mountain in the Alaska Range, in Denali National Park and Preserve. Mount Eldridge lies to the northeast of Denali, overlooking Eldridge Glacier. The mountain is a large massif with several  summits along a ridge. Mount Eldridge was named in 1953 by Bradford Washburn for U.S. Geological Survey explorer George H. Eldridge.

See also
Mountain peaks of Alaska

References

Alaska Range
Mountains of Matanuska-Susitna Borough, Alaska
Denali National Park and Preserve
Mountains of Alaska